Rajasthan University of Health Sciences is a State university located in Pink City Jaipur, Rajasthan, India. It was established on 25 February 2005 under The Rajasthan University of Health Sciences (Act of Rajasthan Vidhan Sabha), 2005 (Act No. 1 of 2005) and started functioning in January 2006. It has its own college and acts as affiliating university to all Government & Society run [Also supports them in academic and research purposes] and some privately run medical colleges in Rajasthan.

History 
In 2005, Rajasthan Vidhan Sabha passed the act which replaced Rajasthan University as affiliating university to Government medical colleges in the western state of Rajasthan. Dr. P. P. S. Mathur,  Senior Professor, Neurosurgery and Medical Superintendent, Sawai Man Singh Hospital, Jaipur served as the first Vice-Chancellor of the university. He was succeeded by Dr. Ashok Panagariya. It established its own university college in the year 2014 which goes by the same name. Earlier it functioned only as affiliating university.

Courses
The university runs the following undergraduate and postgraduate courses: 
 Medical courses: postgraduate education in medical studies, MBBS, Diploma courses.
 Dental courses: MDS, BDS.GNM
 Nursing courses: M.Sc., B.Sc. Nursing, Post basic B.Sc. nursing
 Paramedical science courses
 Physiotherapy and Occupational Therapy courses, B.A.S.L.P.(Bachelor in Audiology & Speech Language Pathology)
 Pharmacy courses: D. Pharm, B. Pharm and M.Pharm.

Affiliated colleges
The following are affiliated to the university: 8 Medical colleges, 10 UG Dental colleges (BDS), 4 Postgraduate dental colleges (MDS), 43 B.Sc. Nursing Colleges, 2 M.Sc. Nursing Colleges, 6 Post Basic B.Sc. Nursing Colleges, 41 Pharmacy colleges (B. Pharmacy), 27 Pharmacy (D. Pharma), 30 Bachelor of Physiotherapy Colleges (BPT) and 4 M.Pharma colleges, with Bachelor of Occupational Therapy College (BOT), B.SC. Radiation Technology College, Post Basic Diploma In Oncology Nursing College, B.SC. (HONS.), Ophthalmic Technology College. Notable colleges include:

Government medical colleges
Sawai Man Singh Medical College
Sardar Patel Medical College, Bikaner
Rabindranath Tagore Medical College
Dr. Sampurnanand Medical College
Jawaharlal Nehru Medical College, Ajmer
Government Medical College, Kota
RUHS College of Medical Sciences, Jaipur

Society Medical Colleges

Barmer Medical College
Bharatpur Medical College
Dungarpur Medical College
Jhalawar Medical College, Jhalawar
Rajmata Vijaya Raje Scindia Medical College, Bhilwara
Pandit Deendayal Upadhyaya Medical College, Churu
Government Medical College, Pali
Sikar Medical College

Pharmacy Colleges

 Regional College of Pharmacy, Jaipur

See also

 Medical Council of India
 National Eligibility and Entrance Test
 Rajasthan University

Notes

External links
 Official website

 
Medical and health sciences universities in India
Educational institutions established in 2005
Medical colleges in Jaipur
Medical colleges in Rajasthan
2005 establishments in Rajasthan